The 1906 Brooklyn Superbas saw Patsy Donovan take over as the team's manager. However, another poor season led to a fifth-place finish.

Offseason 
 December 1905: Mike O'Neill was purchased by the Superbas from the St. Louis Cardinals.
 December 15, 1905: Jimmy Sheckard was traded by the Superbas to the Chicago Cubs for Billy Maloney, Jack McCarthy, Doc Casey, Buttons Briggs and cash.

Regular season

Season standings

Record vs. opponents

Notable transactions 
April 28: Doc Gessler was traded by the Superbas to the Chicago Cubs for Hub Knolls.

Roster

Player stats

Batting

Starters by position 
Note: Pos = Position; G = Games played; AB = At bats; H = Hits; Avg. = Batting average; HR = Home runs; RBI = Runs batted in

Other batters 
Note: G = Games played; AB = At bats; H = Hits; Avg. = Batting average; HR = Home runs; RBI = Runs batted in

Pitching

Starting pitchers 
Note: G = Games pitched; IP = Innings pitched; W = Wins; L = Losses; ERA = Earned run average; SO = Strikeouts

Other pitchers 
Note: G = Games pitched; IP = Innings pitched; W = Wins; L = Losses; ERA = Earned run average; SO = Strikeouts

Relief pitchers 
Note: G = Games pitched; W = Wins; L = Losses; SV = Saves; ERA = Earned run average; SO = Strikeouts

Notes

References 
Baseball-Reference season page
Baseball Almanac season page

External links 
1906 Brooklyn Superbas uniform
Brooklyn Dodgers reference site
Acme Dodgers page 
Retrosheet

Los Angeles Dodgers seasons
Brooklyn Superbas
Brooklyn Superbas
1900s in Brooklyn
Park Slope